Russell Campbell (born 11 June 1957) is a former Australian rules footballer who played with South Melbourne in the Victorian Football League (VFL).

Notes

External links 

Football Card photo: Russell Campbell

Living people
1957 births
Australian rules footballers from New South Wales
Sydney Swans players